The Rural Municipality of Ethelbert is a former rural municipality (RM) in the Canadian province of Manitoba. It was originally incorporated as a rural municipality on March 1, 1905. It ceased on January 1, 2015 as a result of its provincially mandated amalgamation with the Town of Ethelbert to form the Municipality of Ethelbert.

The westernmost approximately one-quarter of the former RM lied within Duck Mountain Provincial Forest. It was the largest area of the forest that lied within any single rural municipality.

Communities 
 Garland
 Mink Creek

References 

 Manitoba Municipalities: Rural Municipality of Ethelbert
 Map of Ethelbert R.M. at Statcan

Ethelbert
Populated places disestablished in 2015
2015 disestablishments in Manitoba